2005 S.League was the tenth season of Singapore's professional football league. It was won by Tampines Rovers, which was their second league title.

Changes from 2004 
 Paya Lebar Punggol joined the league in place of Sinchi FC.
 Tanjong Pagar United withdrew from the S.League from the 2005 season.

Foreign players 
Each club is allowed to have up to a maximum of 4 foreign players.

 Albirex Niigata (S) and Sinchi FC are not allowed to hire any foreigners.

League table

Top scorers

External links 
 S.League 2005

Singapore Premier League seasons
1
Sing
Sing